Cellular respiration is the process by which biological fuels are oxidised in the presence of an inorganic electron acceptor such as oxygen to produce large amounts of energy, to drive the bulk production of adenosine triphosphate (ATP).  Cellular respiration may be described as a set of metabolic reactions and processes that take place in the cells of organisms to convert chemical energy from nutrients into ATP, and then release waste products. 

The reactions involved in respiration are catabolic reactions, which break large molecules into smaller ones, releasing energy (ATP). Respiration is one of the key ways a cell releases chemical energy to fuel cellular activity. The overall reaction occurs in a series of biochemical steps, some of which are redox reactions. Although cellular respiration is technically a combustion reaction, it is an unusual one because of the slow, controlled release of energy from the series of reactions.

Nutrients that are commonly used by animal and plant cells in respiration include sugar, amino acids and fatty acids, and the most common oxidizing agent is molecular oxygen (O2). The chemical energy stored in ATP (the bond of its third phosphate group to the rest of the molecule can be broken allowing more stable products to form, thereby releasing energy for use by the cell) can then be used to drive processes requiring energy, including biosynthesis, locomotion or transport of molecules across cell membranes.

Aerobic respiration 

Aerobic respiration requires oxygen (O2) in order to create ATP. Although carbohydrates, fats, and proteins  are consumed as reactants, aerobic respiration is the preferred method of pyruvate production in glycolysis, and requires pyruvate to the mitochondria in order to be fully oxidized by the citric acid cycle. The products of this process are carbon dioxide and water, and the energy transferred is used to make bond between ADP and a third phosphate group to form ATP (adenosine triphosphate), by substrate-level phosphorylation, NADH and FADH2

The negative ΔG indicates that the reaction can occur spontaneously.

The potential of NADH and FADH2 is converted to more ATP through an electron transport chain with oxygen and protons (hydrogen) as the "terminal electron acceptors". Most of the ATP produced by aerobic cellular respiration is made by oxidative phosphorylation. The energy released is used to create a chemiosmotic potential by pumping protons across a membrane. This potential is then used to drive ATP synthase and produce ATP from ADP and a phosphate group. Biology textbooks often state that 38 ATP molecules can be made per oxidized glucose molecule during cellular respiration (2 from glycolysis, 2 from the Krebs cycle, and about 34 from the electron transport system). However, this maximum yield is never quite reached because of losses due to leaky membranes as well as the cost of moving pyruvate and ADP into the mitochondrial matrix, and current estimates range around 29 to 30 ATP per glucose.

Aerobic metabolism is up to 15 times more efficient than anaerobic metabolism (which yields 2 molecules ATP per 1 molecule glucose). However, some anaerobic organisms, such as methanogens are able to continue with anaerobic respiration, yielding more ATP by using inorganic molecules other than oxygen as final electron acceptors in the electron transport chain. They share the initial pathway of glycolysis but aerobic metabolism continues with the Krebs cycle and oxidative phosphorylation. The post-glycolytic reactions take place in the mitochondria in eukaryotic cells, and in the cytoplasm in prokaryotic cells.

Although plants are net consumers of carbon dioxide and producers of oxygen via photosynthesis, plant respiration accounts for about half of the CO2 generated annually by terrestrial ecosystems.

Glycolysis

Glycolysis is a metabolic pathway that takes place in the cytosol of cells in all living organisms. Glycolysis can be literally translated as "sugar splitting", and occurs with or without the presence of oxygen. In aerobic conditions, the process converts one molecule of glucose into two molecules of pyruvate (pyruvic acid), generating energy in the form of two net molecules of ATP. Four molecules of ATP per glucose are actually produced, but two are consumed as part of the preparatory phase. The initial phosphorylation of glucose is required to increase the reactivity (decrease its stability) in order for the molecule to be cleaved into two pyruvate molecules by the enzyme aldolase. During the pay-off phase of glycolysis, four phosphate groups are transferred to ADP by substrate-level phosphorylation to make four ATP, and two NADH are produced when the pyruvate is oxidized. The overall reaction can be expressed this way:

Glucose + 2 NAD+ + 2 Pi + 2 ADP → 2 pyruvate + 2 H+ + 2 NADH + 2 ATP + 2 H+ + 2 H2O + energy

Starting with glucose,  1 ATP is used to donate a phosphate to glucose to produce glucose 6-phosphate. Glycogen can be converted into glucose 6-phosphate as well with the help of glycogen phosphorylase. During energy metabolism, glucose 6-phosphate becomes fructose 6-phosphate. An additional ATP is used to phosphorylate fructose 6-phosphate into fructose 1,6-bisphosphate by the help of phosphofructokinase. Fructose 1,6-biphosphate then splits into two phosphorylated molecules with three carbon chains which later degrades into pyruvate.

Oxidative decarboxylation of pyruvate

Pyruvate is oxidized to acetyl-CoA and CO2 by the pyruvate dehydrogenase complex (PDC). The PDC contains multiple copies of three enzymes and is located in the mitochondria of eukaryotic cells and in the cytosol of prokaryotes. In the conversion of pyruvate to acetyl-CoA, one molecule of NADH and one molecule of CO2 is formed.

Citric acid cycle

This is also called the Krebs cycle or the tricarboxylic acid cycle. When oxygen is present, acetyl-CoA is produced from the pyruvate molecules created from glycolysis. Once acetyl-CoA is formed, aerobic or anaerobic respiration can occur. When oxygen is present, the mitochondria will undergo aerobic respiration which leads to the Krebs cycle.  However, if oxygen is not present, fermentation of the pyruvate molecule will occur. In the presence of oxygen, when acetyl-CoA is produced, the molecule then enters the citric acid cycle (Krebs cycle) inside the mitochondrial matrix, and is oxidized to CO2 while at the same time reducing NAD to NADH. NADH can be used by the electron transport chain to create further ATP as part of oxidative phosphorylation. To fully oxidize the equivalent of one glucose molecule, two acetyl-CoA must be metabolized by the Krebs cycle. Two low-energy waste products, H2O and CO2, are created during this cycle. 

The citric acid cycle is an 8-step process involving 18 different enzymes and co-enzymes. During the cycle, acetyl-CoA (2 carbons) + oxaloacetate (4 carbons) yields citrate (6 carbons), which is rearranged to a more reactive form called isocitrate (6 carbons). Isocitrate is modified to become α-ketoglutarate (5 carbons), succinyl-CoA, succinate, fumarate, malate, and, finally, oxaloacetate.

The net gain from one cycle is 3 NADH and 1 FADH2 as hydrogen- (proton plus electron)-carrying compounds and 1 high-energy GTP, which may subsequently be used to produce ATP. Thus, the total yield from 1 glucose molecule (2 pyruvate molecules) is 6 NADH, 2 FADH2, and 2 ATP.

Oxidative phosphorylation

In eukaryotes, oxidative phosphorylation occurs in the mitochondrial cristae. It comprises the electron transport chain that establishes a proton gradient (chemiosmotic potential) across the boundary of the inner membrane by oxidizing the NADH produced from the Krebs cycle. ATP is synthesized by the ATP synthase enzyme when the chemiosmotic gradient is used to drive the phosphorylation of ADP. The electrons are finally transferred to exogenous oxygen and, with the addition of two protons, water is formed.

Efficiency of ATP production
The table below describes the reactions involved when one glucose molecule is fully oxidized into carbon dioxide. It is assumed that all the reduced coenzymes are oxidized by the electron transport chain and used for oxidative phosphorylation.

Although there is a theoretical yield of 38 ATP molecules per glucose during cellular respiration, such conditions are generally not realized because of losses such as the cost of moving pyruvate (from glycolysis), phosphate, and ADP (substrates for ATP synthesis) into the mitochondria. All are actively transported using carriers that utilize the stored energy in the proton electrochemical gradient.
 Pyruvate is taken up by a specific, low Km transporter to bring it into the mitochondrial matrix for oxidation by the pyruvate dehydrogenase complex.
 The phosphate carrier (PiC) mediates the electroneutral exchange (antiport) of phosphate (H2PO4−; Pi) for OH− or symport of phosphate and protons (H+) across the inner membrane, and the driving force for moving phosphate ions into the mitochondria is the proton motive force.
 The ATP-ADP translocase (also called adenine nucleotide translocase, ANT) is an antiporter and exchanges ADP and ATP across the inner membrane. The driving force is due to the ATP (−4) having a more negative charge than the ADP (−3), and thus it dissipates some of the electrical component of the proton electrochemical gradient.

The outcome of these transport processes using the proton electrochemical gradient is that more than 3 H+ are needed to make 1 ATP. Obviously, this reduces the theoretical efficiency of the whole process and the likely maximum is closer to 28–30 ATP molecules. In practice the efficiency may be even lower because the inner membrane of the mitochondria is slightly leaky to protons. Other factors may also dissipate the proton gradient creating an apparently leaky mitochondria. An uncoupling protein known as thermogenin is expressed in some cell types and is a channel that can transport protons. When this protein is active in the inner membrane it short circuits the coupling between the electron transport chain and ATP synthesis. The potential energy from the proton gradient is not used to make ATP but generates heat. This is particularly important in brown fat thermogenesis of newborn and hibernating mammals.

According to some newer sources, the ATP yield during aerobic respiration is not 36–38, but only about 30–32 ATP molecules / 1 molecule of glucose , because:
 ATP : NADH+H+ and ATP : FADH2 ratios during the oxidative phosphorylation appear to be not 3 and 2, but 2.5 and 1.5 respectively. Unlike in the substrate-level phosphorylation, the stoichiometry here is difficult to establish.
 ATP synthase produces 1 ATP / 3 H+. However the exchange of matrix ATP for cytosolic ADP and Pi (antiport with OH− or symport with H+) mediated by ATP–ADP translocase and phosphate carrier consumes 1 H+ / 1 ATP as a result of regeneration of the transmembrane potential changed during this transfer, so the net ratio is 1 ATP : 4 H+.
 The mitochondrial electron transport chain proton pump transfers across the inner membrane 10 H+ / 1 NADH+H+ (4 + 2 + 4) or 6 H+ / 1 FADH2 (2 + 4).
So the final stoichiometry is
1 NADH+H+ : 10 H+ : 10/4 ATP = 1 NADH+H+ : 2.5 ATP
1 FADH2 : 6 H+ : 6/4 ATP = 1 FADH2 : 1.5 ATP
 ATP : NADH+H+ coming from glycolysis ratio during the oxidative phosphorylation is
 1.5, as for FADH2, if hydrogen atoms (2H++2e−) are transferred from cytosolic NADH+H+ to mitochondrial FAD by the glycerol phosphate shuttle located in the inner mitochondrial membrane.
 2.5 in case of malate-aspartate shuttle transferring hydrogen atoms from cytosolic NADH+H+ to mitochondrial NAD+

So finally we have, per molecule of glucose
 Substrate-level phosphorylation: 2 ATP from glycolysis + 2 ATP (directly GTP) from Krebs cycle
 Oxidative phosphorylation
 2 NADH+H+ from glycolysis: 2 × 1.5 ATP (if glycerol phosphate shuttle transfers hydrogen atoms) or 2 × 2.5 ATP (malate-aspartate shuttle)
 2 NADH+H+ from the oxidative decarboxylation of pyruvate and 6 from Krebs cycle: 8 × 2.5 ATP
 2 FADH2 from the Krebs cycle: 2 × 1.5 ATP
Altogether this gives 4 + 3 (or 5) + 20 + 3 = 30 (or 32) ATP per molecule of glucose

These figures may still require further tweaking as new structural details become available. The above value of 3 H+/ATP for the synthase assumes that the synthase translocates 9 protons, and produces 3 ATP, per rotation. The number of protons depends on the number of c subunits in the Fo c-ring, and it is now known that this is 10 in yeast Fo and 8 for vertebrates. Including one H+ for the transport reactions, this means that synthesis of one ATP requires 1+10/3=4.33 protons in yeast and 1+8/3 = 3.67 in vertebrates. This would imply that in human mitochondria the 10 protons from oxidizing NADH would produce 2.72 ATP (instead of 2.5) and the 6 protons from oxidizing succinate or ubiquinol would produce 1.64 ATP (instead of 1.5). This is consistent with experimental results within the margin of error described in a recent review.

The total ATP yield in ethanol or lactic acid fermentation is only 2 molecules coming from glycolysis, because pyruvate is not transferred to the mitochondrion and finally oxidized to the carbon dioxide (CO2), but reduced to ethanol or lactic acid in the cytoplasm.

Fermentation

Without oxygen, pyruvate (pyruvic acid) is not metabolized by cellular respiration but undergoes a process of fermentation. The pyruvate is not transported into the mitochondrion but remains in the cytoplasm, where it is converted to waste products that may be removed from the cell. This serves the purpose of oxidizing the electron carriers so that they can perform glycolysis again and removing the excess pyruvate. Fermentation oxidizes NADH to NAD+ so it can be re-used in glycolysis.  In the absence of oxygen, fermentation prevents the buildup of NADH in the cytoplasm and provides NAD+ for glycolysis.  This waste product varies depending on the organism. In skeletal muscles, the waste product is lactic acid. This type of fermentation is called lactic acid fermentation. In strenuous exercise, when energy demands exceed energy supply, the respiratory chain cannot process all of the hydrogen atoms joined by NADH. During anaerobic glycolysis, NAD+ regenerates when pairs of hydrogen combine with pyruvate to form lactate. Lactate formation is catalyzed by lactate dehydrogenase in a reversible reaction. Lactate can also be used as an indirect precursor for liver glycogen. During recovery, when oxygen becomes available, NAD+ attaches to hydrogen from lactate to form ATP. In yeast, the waste products are ethanol and carbon dioxide. This type of fermentation is known as alcoholic or ethanol fermentation. The ATP generated in this process is made by substrate-level phosphorylation, which does not require oxygen.

Fermentation is less efficient at using the energy from glucose: only 2 ATP are produced per glucose, compared to the 38 ATP per glucose nominally produced by aerobic respiration.  Glycolytic ATP, however, is created more quickly. For prokaryotes to continue a rapid growth rate when they are shifted from an aerobic environment to an anaerobic environment, they must increase the rate of the glycolytic reactions. For multicellular organisms, during short bursts of strenuous activity, muscle cells use fermentation to supplement the ATP production from the slower aerobic respiration, so fermentation may be used by a cell even before the oxygen levels are depleted, as is the case in sports that do not require athletes to pace themselves, such as sprinting.

Anaerobic respiration

Cellular respiration is the process by which biological fuels are oxidised in the presence of an inorganic electron acceptor such as oxygen to produce large amounts of energy, to drive the bulk production of ATP.

Anaerobic respiration is used by microorganisms either bacteria or archaea  in which neither oxygen (aerobic respiration) nor pyruvate derivatives (fermentation) is the final electron acceptor.  Rather, an inorganic acceptor such as sulfate (SO42-), nitrate (NO3–), or sulfur (S) is used.
Such organisms could be found in unusual places such as underwater caves or near hydrothermal vents at the bottom of the ocean., as well as in anoxic soils or sediment in wetland ecosystems.

In July 2019, a scientific study of Kidd Mine in Canada discovered sulfur-breathing organisms which live 7900 feet (2407.92 meters) below the surface, and which breathe sulfur in order to survive. These organisms are also remarkable due to consuming minerals such as pyrite as their food source.

See also
 Maintenance respiration: maintenance as a functional component of cellular respiration
 Microphysiometry
 Pasteur point
 Respirometry: research tool to explore cellular respiration
 Tetrazolium chloride: cellular respiration indicator
 Complex 1: NADH:ubiquinone oxidoreductes

References

External links

 A detailed description of respiration vs. fermentation
 Kimball's online resource for cellular respiration
 Cellular Respiration and Fermentation at Clermont College

 
Metabolism
Plant physiology